UAFA may stand for:

 Uniting American Families Act, a U.S. bill to amend the Immigration and Nationality Act
 Union of Arab Football Associations, a football association that organises several tournaments between CAF and AFC Arab Nations